The Pamban Lighthouse is one of the two lighthouses on the Rameswaram island in Tamil Nadu. It is also known as Pamban channel northwest point lighthouse.

Structure 

Pamban lighthouse was originally constructed in 1845, comprising a cylindrical tower with a balcony and lantern. Its pattern markings are horizontal white and black bands, with a white lantern and red roof. The lighthouse stands at 66 ft (20 m) tall, with a focal height of 95 ft (29 m) providing three white flashes every 9 seconds.

The lighthouse is located on the north side of Pamban Island east of the Pamban Channel Bridge.

See also

 List of lighthouses in India

References

External links
Directorate General of Lighthouses and Lightships

Lighthouses in Tamil Nadu
Ramanathapuram district
Lighthouses completed in 1879
1879 establishments in India
Transport in Rameswaram